The .280 Ackley Improved (.280 AI) was the result of the .280 Remington case modification by P.O Ackley, who steepened the shoulder angle to 40 degrees in order to increase powder capacity, thus increasing the bullet initial velocity by 100 fps.

History 
In 1957 Remington introduced the .280 Remington, which was based on the .30-06 Springfield case necked down to 7mm. The cartridge was intended to compete with the .30-06 and the .270 Winchester. 

Although the .280 Remington is considered to be a very balanced cartridge combining the best attributes of both cartridiges due to the high ballistic coefficient and sectional density, characteristic of 7mm calibers, it did not reach the popularity achieved by the .30-06 and .270 Win.

The famous wildcatter P.O Ackley, worked on the .280 Remington case in order to add it to the line of "Ackley Improved" cartridges and named it the .280 Ackley Improved 40 degrees. By 2008, Nosler standardized it and SAAMI accepted it. Ever since, the .280 Ackley Improved has earned great popularity in the US market. Several different companies manufacture rifles chambered in .280 AI, including the Ruger M77 Hawkeye, Savage 110, Browning X-Bolt and Weatherby Mark V.

Design 
The .280 AI is basically the .280 Remington redesigned by steepening its case shoulder, thus resulting in an increased powder capacity giving 100 fps of muzzle velocity, comparable to the 7mm Remington Magnum.

The differences between the .280 Remington and the .280 Ackley improved are minimal. A .280 Remington cartridge fired from a rifle chambered in .280 Ackley Improved will result in a case formed for the latter, which may be used for reloading.

Performance

280 Ackley Improved Vs. 280 Remington 
Loaded with a 150 grain bullet, the .280 AI shot from a 24" barrel gives a muzzle velocity of approximately 3,060 fps, which is about 100 fps faster than a .280 Remington loaded with a bullet of similar weight. Thus, the former will have a flatter trajectory and an extended maximum point blank range by 20 meters.

280 Ackley Improved Vs. 270 Winchester 
A 150 grain bullet shot from a .280 AI generates a muzzle velocity similar to the .270 Winchester firing a 130 grain bullet. Being a heavier projectile of the .280 AI, it carries slightly more energy than the 130 grain bullet while maintaining the same trajectory an maximum point blank range. If both cartridges are fired with bullets of the same weight, the .280 AI has a flatter trajectory but the .270 Win offers a higher ballistic coefficient and sectional density.

280 Ackley Improved Vs. 7mm Remington Magnum 
According to Nosler reloading data, although the .7mm Remington Magnum does not provide more than 50 fps over the .280 AI with similar projectiles, the latter cartridge holds less powder in its case, thus it is considered more efficient. However, the published data is provided from a .280 AI tested with a 26" barrel rifle, while the .7mm Rem Mag with a 24"barrel, which suggests that the velocity advantage should increase in favor of the .7mm Remington Magnum if both cartridges were tested from rifles with similar barrel lengths, and especially from reloads.

Sporting use 
For practical purposes, the .280 Ackley Improved is similar to the .270 Winchester, 30-06 Springfield and .280 Remingon. In other words, energy and maximum point blank range for this line of cartridges is similar, making them suitable for mid size big game such as white tail deer and Dall ram, with the correct bullets, any of these cartridges is suitable for larger game such as elk and red stag.

References 

Pistol and rifle cartridges